Ryumin is a Russian masculine surname, its feminine counterpart is Ryumina. It may refer to
Bestuzhev-Ryumin (disambiguation)
 Mikhail Ryumin (1913–1954), Deputy Head of the Soviet Ministry of State Security
 Valery Ryumin (born 1939), Soviet cosmonaut

Russian-language surnames